Topnoi Kiwram  (born August 15, 1992) is a Thai Muay Thai and mixed martial artist who competes in the Flyweight division. He has previously fought in Rizin Fighting Federation and UAE Warriors.

Mixed martial arts career

Rizin Fighting Federation
Topnoi was scheduled to make his debut against Kai Asakura on July 29, 2018 at Rizin 11. However, Asakura was pulled from the event due to a knee injury and replaced by "Onibozu" Tadaaki Yamamoto. He won the fight via knockout in the first round.

The bout against Kai Asakura was rescheduled this time for September 30, 2018 at Rizin 13. He lost the fight via unanimous decision.

Topnoi faced Yusaku Nakamura on June 2, 2019 at Rizin 16. He lost the fight via unanimous decision.

UAE Warriors
Topnoi faced Isaac Pimentel, replacing Shannon Ross on September 25, 2020 at UAE Warriors 13. He won the fight via majority decision.

Road to UFC
Topnoi faced Yuma Horiuchi in the Quarter-Finals of the Flyweight tournament on June 9, 2022 at Road to UFC: Episode 3. He won the bout via unanimous decision.

Topnoi faced Park Hyun Sung in the Semi-Finals of the Flyweight tournament on October 23, 2022 at Road to UFC: Episode 6. He lost the bout in the first round, being submitted via rear naked choke.

Mixed martial arts record

|-
|Loss
|align=center|8–4
|Park Hyun Sung	
|Submission (rear-naked choke)
|Road to UFC: Episode 6
|
|align=center|1
|align=center|3:05
|Abu Dhabi, United Arab Emirates
|
|-
| Win
| align=center| 8–3
| Yuma Horiuchi
| Decision (unanimous)
| Road to UFC: Episode 3
| 
| align=center| 3
| align=center| 5:00
| Kallang, Singapore 
| 
|-
| Win
| align=center| 7–3
| Isaac Pimentel
| Decision (majority)
| UAE Warriors 13
| 
| align=center| 3
| align=center| 5:00
| Abu Dhabi, United Arab Emirates 
| 
|-
| Loss
| align=center| 6–3
| Yusaku Nakamura
| Decision (unanimous)
| Rizin 16
| 
| align=center| 3
| align=center| 5:00
| Kobe, Japan
| 
|-
| Loss
| align=center| 6–2
| Kai Asakura
| Decision (unanimous)
| Rizin 13
| 
| align=center| 3
| align=center| 5:00
| Saitama, Japan
| 
|-
| Win
| align=center| 6–1
| Tadaaki Yamamoto
| KO (punch)
| Rizin 11
| 
| align=center| 1
| align=center| 1:06
| Saitama, Japan
| 
|-
| Win
| align=center| 5–1
| Mern Mea Kea
| TKO (submission to punches)
| Full Metal Dojo 14
| 
| align=center| 2
| align=center| 1:20
| Bangkok, Thailand
| 
|-
| Win
| align=center| 4–1
| Mohammad Zakhir
| TKO (submission to punches)
| Thailand Fighting Championship 2
| 
| align=center| 1
| align=center| N/A
| Khao Lak, Thailand
|
|-
| Win
| align=center| 3–1
| Jayson Margallo
| Decision (unanimous)
| Primal FC: Dark Moon Rising
| 
| align=center| 3
| align=center| 5:00
| Phuket, Thailand
| 
|-
| Win
| align=center| 2–1
| Anton Larsson
| TKO (punches)
| Full Metal Dojo 12: The 37th Chamber
| 
| align=center| 1
| align=center| 0:13
| Bangkok, Thailand
| 
|-
| Win
| align=center| 1–1
| Sawich Maruang
| KO/TKO
| Full Metal Dojo 11: Sweep all the Legs
| 
| align=center| 1
| align=center| 4:20
| Bangkok, Thailand
| 
|-
| Loss
| align=center| 0–1
| Yodkaikaew Fairtex
| TKO (punches)
| Full Metal Dojo 10: to Live and Die in Thailand
| 
| align=center| 1
| align=center| 4:14
| Phuket, Thailand
| 
|-

See also 
 List of male mixed martial artists

References

External links 

1992 births
Living people
Topnoi Kiwram
Topnoi Kiwram
Topnoi Kiwram
Flyweight mixed martial artists
Bantamweight mixed martial artists
Mixed martial artists utilizing Muay Thai